Work Service–Vitalcare–Dynatek (UCI code: IWD) is an Italian cycling team founded in 2005, that became a UCI Continental team in 2020.

Team roster

References

External links

UCI Continental Teams (Europe)
Cycling teams based in Italy
Cycling teams established in 2020